The 2022 ICF World Junior and U23 Canoe Sprint Championships (23rd Junior and 9th U23) took place in Szeged, Hungary from 31 August to 4 September 2022.

Schedule 
Preliminary schedule of 2022 ICF Canoe Sprint Junior & U23 World Championships

Medalists

Junior

Men

Women

Mixed

U23

Men

Women

Mixed

Medal table 
After Day 4

Nations Ranking 

Nations Cup ranking

Nations Cup ranking - Overall

Rank 	NF 	Total

1 	Hun 	HUN 	1392

2 	Esp 	ESP 	1126

3 	Ger 	GER 	1043

4 	Pol 	POL 	979

5 	Ita 	ITA 	776

6 	Ukr 	UKR 	768

7 	Can 	CAN 	764

8 	Cze 	CZE 	643

9 	Aus 	AUS 	565

10 	Svk 	SVK 	456

11 	Por 	POR 	437

12 	Den 	DEN 	377

13 	Mex 	MEX 	374

14 	Kaz 	KAZ 	373

15 	Chn 	CHN 	369

16 	Srb 	SRB 	351

17 	Gbr 	GBR 	342

17 	Mda 	MDA 	342

19 	Usa 	USA 	338

20 	Fra 	FRA 	316

21 	Rou 	ROU 	310

22 	Uzb 	UZB 	283

23 	Swe 	SWE 	239

24 	Ltu 	LTU 	182

25 	Lat 	LAT 	174

26 	Bul 	BUL 	156

26 	Slo 	SLO 	156

28 	Tha 	THA 	152

29 	Nor 	NOR 	149

30 	Iri 	IRI 	144

31 	Arg 	ARG 	130

32 	Nzl 	NZL 	123

33 	Bel 	BEL 	121

34 	Cub 	CUB 	118

35 	Gre 	GRE 	107

36 	Tur 	TUR 	95

37 	Aut 	AUT 	93

38 	Cro 	CRO 	87

39 	Est 	EST 	85

40 	Jpn 	JPN 	82

41 	Sui 	SUI 	81

42 	Chi 	CHI 	70

43 	Rsa 	RSA 	69

44 	Sgp 	SGP 	56

45 	Irl 	IRL 	55

46 	Geo 	GEO 	53

47 	Bra 	BRA 	52

48 	Ned 	NED 	41

49 	Tpe 	TPE 	32

50 	Tun 	TUN 	19

51 	Fin 	FIN 	15

52 	Isr 	ISR 	13

53 	Kgz 	KGZ 	12

54 	Egy 	EGY 	8

55 	Ven 	VEN 	6

56 	Pur 	PUR 	5

56 	Cyp 	CYP 	5

58 	Arm 	ARM 	4

59 	Hkg 	HKG 	3

60 	Ngr 	NGR 	2

60 	Tjk 	TJK 	2

60 	Uru 	URU 	2

60 	Uae 	UAE 	2

64 	Mkd 	MKD 	1

See also 
 ICF World Junior and U23 Canoe Slalom Championships
 ICF Canoe Sprint World Championships
 International Canoe Federation
 Canoe Sprint European Championships

References

External links 
 International Canoe Federation
 https://www.the-sports.org/canoeing-world-sprint-championships-u-23-2022-medals-epa119378.html
 https://www.the-sports.org/canoeing-world-junior-sprint-championships-2022-medals-epa119379.html
 https://www.canoeicf.com/results-records
 https://www.canoeicf.com/results – Historical results
 http://www.canoeresults.eu/ – Historical results

World Junior and U23 Canoe Sprint Championships
ICF World Junior and U23 Canoe Sprint Championships
Sport in Szeged
ICF